Jakob Green Jensen (born 10 July 1982) is a Danish handballer, currently playing for Danish Handball League side Team Tvis Holstebro. He has two times won the Danish championship with GOG Svendborg.

He has played six matches for the Danish national handball team.

References

1982 births
Living people
Danish male handball players
People from Næstved
Sportspeople from Region Zealand